Kimberly A. With is an American ecologist. She is a Full Professor in the Division of Biology at Kansas State University.

Career
Between 1988 and 1992, With served as Associate Editor for the journal Proceedings of the Western Foundation of Vertebrate Zoology, published by the Western Foundation of Vertebrate Zoology. She simultaneously earned her PhD in Biology from Colorado State University.

After receiving her PhD, With sat on the Executive Committee of the Theoretical Ecology Section as a Secretary Officer for the Ecological Society of America from 1995–1997. During this time, her paper "Critical thresholds in species' responses to landscape structure" earned her the Award for Outstanding Paper published in the discipline of Landscape Ecology by the U. S. Regional Association of the International Association for Landscape Ecology. She also led an investigation with fellow Bowling Green State University professor Daniel Pavuk to examine the effects of Habitat Fragmentation on Biodiversity and Trophic Linkages in Experimental Fractal Landscapes.

In 2000, she left Bowling Green State University to become an Assistant Professor at Kansas State University. She also joined the Konza Prairie LTER, a  program designed to address long-term research questions relevant to tallgrass prairie ecosystems, and the science of ecology in general. In 2002, With was again the recipient of the Award for Outstanding Paper, making her the only person to be awarded this distinction twice.

In 2009, With led a study which found that birds were not breeding successfully in the Flint Hills and more than 80 percent of nests were destroyed by predators. The results of her study was published in the journal Biological Conservation. She then took a sabbatical leave during the 2010-2011 academic year. In 2013, With was promoted to Full Professor in the Department of Biology.

In 2016, With was the recipient of the Distinguished Landscape Ecologist Award from the U.S.-International Association for Landscape Ecology. Three years later, she received a Faculty Development Awards from Kansas State University to fund future research endeavorments. On August 29, 2019, With published "Essentials of Landscape Ecology" through the Oxford University Press.

Selected publications
Critical thresholds in species' responses to landscape structure (1995)
Landscape connectivity and population distributions in heterogeneous environments (1997)
The population biology of invasive species (2001)
The landscape ecology of invasive spread (2002)
Dispersal success in spatially structured landscapes: when do spatial pattern and dispersal behavior really matter? (2002)
Landscape connectivity: a return to the basics (2006)
Essentials of Landscape Ecology (2019)

References

External links 
 
Website

Living people
Kansas State University faculty
Bowling Green State University faculty
Colorado State University alumni
American ecologists
Women ecologists
San Francisco State University alumni
Northern Arizona University alumni
20th-century American scientists
20th-century American women scientists
21st-century American scientists
21st-century American women scientists
Year of birth missing (living people)
American women academics